The Cavalier Open was a golf tournament on the LPGA Tour, played only in 1959. It was played at the Cavalier Yacht & Country Club in Virginia Beach, Virginia. Mickey Wright won the event.

References

Former LPGA Tour events
Golf in Virginia
1959 establishments in Virginia
1959 disestablishments in Virginia
History of women in Virginia